Songs from the West Coast Tour was a concert tour by Elton John that took place between 2001 and 2002 to promote John's latest album at that time, Songs from the West Coast.

The 2001 leg visited Canada, the United States, Mexico and Japan. It was the first time Elton John had visited Japan since 1998 Face to Face. It was also the first time Elton John visited Mexico since The One Tour in 1992. 

It was the first tour for Nigel Olsson to play drums for the Elton John Band since 1984's Breaking Hearts Tour.

The tour continued in 2002 after Face to Face 2002 and a tour of Australia. The tour started in Benidorm, Spain and came to a close in Birmingham, England on 15 December.

Setlists

Tour dates

References

External links
 Information Site with Tour Dates

Notes

Elton John concert tours
2001 concert tours
2002 concert tours